Line 2 of Metrovalencia opened on March 6, 2015 in the city of Valencia, Spain. The line, which featured no new stations, was created as part of a restructuring of public transport in the city. It replaced the branch of Line 1 which ran from Llíria to Torrent.

History
The original line 2 of Metrovalencia was opened with the rest of the network in 1988 and ran from Llíria to Villanueva de Castellón. On 16 September 1999, line 2 ceased to exist when it was merged into line 1.

In the 2000s, a new line 2 was planned, to run from Tavernes Blanques to Valencia's Natzaret district. As of October 2018, this line is partially complete. Construction had been halted for several years due to Spain's economic problems, but resumed in June 2017 and that line is now designated as Line 10. The line 2 designation is now used for existing branches of the network. The frequency of trains on these branches will remain unchanged.

References

External links 

Metrovalencia
1988 establishments in the Valencian Community
1999 disestablishments in the Valencian Community
2015 establishments in the Valencian Community
Rapid transit lines in Spain